The Archdiocese of Malta (Malti: Arċidjoċesi ta' Malta) is a metropolitan archdiocese of the Latin Church of the Catholic Church in Malta.

History
Tradition claims that St. Paul the Apostle established the diocese of Malta in the year 60 A.D when he ordained the Roman governor, Saint Publius, as the first bishop of Malta.

The Diocese of Malta was made a suffragan diocese to the Metropolitan Archdiocese of Palermo by a Papal Bull of Pope Adrian IV on 10 July 1156 and confirmed by Pope Alexander III on 26 April 1160. The former Diocese of Malta, which is one of the oldest dioceses in the world, was elevated to archdiocese on January 1, 1944. The Diocese of Malta included the islands of Malta, Gozo and Comino. On September 22, 1864, the diocese lost the territories of Gozo and Comino when Pope Pius IX established the Diocese of Gozo which became a suffragan diocese to Malta.

Cathedrals
There are two cathedrals in the diocese: The Metropolitan Cathedral of Saint Paul, in Mdina, and the Co-Cathedral of Saint John the Baptist, located in Valletta.

Important dates
22 January (previously 21 January) - Memorial of Saint Publius
5 February - Memorial of St. Agatha of Sicily 
10 February - Solemnity of the Shipwreck of St Paul
25 February - Memorial of Maria Adeodata Pisani
9 May - Feast of St. George Preca 
1 July - Memorial of Nazju Falzon
8 October - Dedication of the Metropolitan Cathedral

Flag 
The flag is a bicolour consisting of yellow on left and white on the right. It is a 2:3 ratio; the same as the Maltese flag.

Suffragan
Diocese of Gozo

Bishops of Malta

Auxiliary Bishops of Malta

Annetto Casolani (1848–1866)
Michael Franciscus Buttigieg (1863–1864)
Salvatore Gaffiero (1899–1906) 
Paolo Rosario Farrugia (1907)
Angelo Portelli (1911–1927) 
Emmanuele Galea (1942–1974) 
Emanuele Gerada (1967–1968) 
Joseph Mercieca (1974–1976) 
Annetto Depasquale (1998–2011)
Charles J. Scicluna (2012–2015)
Joseph Galea-Curmi (2018–)

See also

Culture of Malta
History of Malta
List of Churches in Malta
List of monasteries and convents in Malta
Religion in Malta

Further reading
 Outline of Maltese History 1971 AC. Aquilina & Co; Appendix III.

References

External links
 
 Bishops of Malta
 

Apostolic sees
Catholic Church in Malta
Dioceses established in the 1st century
Malta